Goniopleura is a genus of leaf beetles in the subfamily Eumolpinae. It is found in Southeast Asia. It is sometimes treated as a subgenus of Aulexis.

Species
The genus contains ten species:
 Goniopleura auricoma Westwood, 1832
 Goniopleura auricoma auricoma Westwood, 1832 – Peninsular Malaysia (Penang)
 Goniopleura auricoma basalis Jacoby, 1882 – Sumatra
 Goniopleura auricoma bicoloripes Gahan, 1895 – Java
 Goniopleura auricoma borneensis Medvedev, 1998 – Borneo (Sarawak)
 Goniopleura auricoma niasica Medvedev, 1998 – Nias
 Goniopleura chapuisi Thomson, 1875 – Borneo (Sabah)
 Goniopleura fulva Medvedev & Romantsov, 2014 – Borneo (Sabah)
 Goniopleura kinabaluensis Takizawa, 2017 – Borneo (Sabah)
 Goniopleura moseri Weise, 1922 – Vietnam
 Goniopleura nigriventris Medvedev, 1998 – Sumatra
 Goniopleura shuteae Medvedev, 2011
 Goniopleura suturalis Pic, 1928 – Vietnam
 Goniopleura tonkinea Pic, 1928 – Laos, Vietnam
 Goniopleura viridipennis Clark, 1865
 Goniopleura viridipennis nigripes Medvedev, 1998 – Borneo (Sabah)
 Goniopleura viridipennis sumatrana Medvedev, 1998 – Sumatra
 Goniopleura viridipennis viridipennis Clark, 1865 – Peninsular Malaysia (Penang, Malacca)

References

Eumolpinae
Chrysomelidae genera
Taxa named by John O. Westwood
Beetles of Asia